A general election was held in the U.S. state of Pennsylvania on November 8, 2016.

Pennsylvania certified Trump's state victory on December 12, 2016.

State elections

Pennsylvania Senate

Pennsylvania House of Representatives

Federal elections

President and vice president of the United States

United States House of Representatives

References

 
Pennsylvania